Tyler Grisham (born June 11, 1987) is an American football coach and former wide receiver who is currently the wide receivers coach at Clemson University.

College career
Grisham played college football at Clemson from 2005 to 2009. He finished his college career with 132 career receptions for 1,390 yards and eight touchdowns.

Professional career

Pittsburgh Steelers
After the completion of his college football career, Grisham was signed by the Pittsburgh Steelers as a free agent after going undrafted in the 2009 NFL Draft. He spent the first 12 games of the 2009 NFL season on the Steelers practice squad, and was added to the 53-man roster on December 10, 2009 after an injury to another receiver.  Grisham made his first NFL reception on December 27, 2009 against the Baltimore Ravens for 14 yards, resulting in a first down.

Following the 2010 preseason, he was cut on September 4 when the Steelers set their 53-man roster. He was then signed to their practice squad on September 6 and finished the season in that roster status.

In 2011, Grisham was waived as part of the final cuts to the 53-man roster on September 2, but was added to the Steelers' practice squad on September 4 and again stayed in that roster status for the remainder of the season.

Grisham spent the 2010 and 2011 seasons on the Steelers' practice squad.

Denver Broncos
Grisham signed a futures contract with the Denver Broncos in 2012, but was cut during the preseason.

Coaching career
In 2019, Grisham was named the Clemson Tigers’ new wide receivers coach, replacing Jeff Scott, who accepted the job to be South Florida’s new head football coach.

References

External links 
Clemson Tigers bio

1987 births
Living people
Sportspeople from Birmingham, Alabama
Players of American football from Birmingham, Alabama
American football wide receivers
Clemson Tigers football players
Clemson University alumni
Pittsburgh Steelers players
Denver Broncos players
Clemson Tigers football coaches